Allylcyclopentane is a hydrocarbon that has the formula C8H14. This compound is a colourless liquid at room temperature.  It has been prepared from cyclopentylmagnesium bromide and allyl bromide.

References

Allyl compounds
Cyclopentyl compounds